Eastern Pwo or Phlou, is a Karen language spoken by Eastern Pwo people and over a million people in Burma and by about 50,000 in Thailand, where it has been called Southern Pwo. It is not intelligible with other varieties of Pwo.

A script called Leke was developed between 1830 and 1860 and is used by members of the millenarian Leke sect of Buddhism. Otherwise, a variety of Mon-Burmese alphabets are used, and refugees in Thailand have created a Thai alphabet that is in limited use.

Distribution
Kayin State and Tanintharyi Region: long contiguous area near the Thai border
Bago Region: Bago and Toungoo townships

Phonology 
The following displays the phonological features of two of the eastern Pwo Karen dialects, Pa'an and Tavoy:

Consonants 

 Post-alveolar affricates //, are realized as fricatives [], among some formal dialects.
// when pronounced slowly is phonetically realized as a dental affricate [].
Voiced plosives // are pronounced as implosives [] only in the Pa'an dialect.
// does not exist in the Tavoy dialect.
// may tend to be slightly fricativized [] when preceding front vowels.
// may also be realized as a tap [].

Vowels 

 // does not occur after a // sound.
// are merged with // in the Tavoy dialect.

Tones 
Four tones are present in Eastern Pwo:

Dialects
Pa’an (Inland Eastern Pwo Karen, Moulmein)
Kawkareik (Eastern Border Pwo Karen)
Tavoy (Southern Pwo Karen)

Alphabet

History 
The alphabet used for Eastern Pwo Karen language is in Mon-Burmese script.

The Eastern Pwo Karen numeric symbols have been proposed for encoding in a future Burmese Unicode block.

 The number zero, ploh plih (ပၠဝ်ပၠေ), means "of no value".

 The number zero is not used in day-to-day life and mostly exists in writing only. People are taught to use the Burmese numeric system instead, including zero.
Chi (ဆီ့) denotes 10, any number from 1 to 9 before chi can be interpreted as "of ten(s)", so 20 would be ne chi. Pong (ဖငၲ) denotes 100, any number from 1 to 9 before pong can be interpreted as "hundred(s)", so 200 would be ne pong. Similarly, the same rule applies to thousand, muh (မိုငၲ့); ten-thousand, lah (လါ); and hundred-thousand, thay (သိငၲႉ).
 Numbers after the hundred-thousands (millions and above) are prefixed with thay (သိငၲႉ), hundred thousand. For example, one million would be thay luh chi (သိငၲႉလ်ုဆီ့), "hundred thousand of tens"; two million would be thay ne chi (သိငၲႉဏီ့ဆီ့), hundred thousand of two tens; ten million would be thay luh pong (သိငၲႉလ်ုဖငၲ), "hundred thousand of hundreds"; one billion would be thay luh lah (သိငၲႉလ်ုလါ), "hundred thousand of ten thousands".

Decimals 
Due to the close approximation to Thailand, the Eastern Pwo Karen adopts Thai's decimal word, chut, (Karen: ကျူဒၲ, ကျူ(ဒၲ); Thai: จุด; English: and, dot). For example, 1.01 is luh chut ploh plih luh (လ်ု         ပၠဝ်ပၠေလ်ု).

Fractions 
Fractions are formed by saying puh (ပုံႉ) after the numerator and the denominator. For example, one-third (1/3) would be luh puh thuh puh (လ်ုပုံသိုငၲ့ပုံ) and three over one, three-"oneths" (3/1) would be thuh puh luh puh (သိုငၲ့ပုံလ်ုပုံ).

References 

Karenic languages